Langya Temple is a Buddhist temple located on Mount Langya, in Langya District of Chuzhou, Anhui, China.

History

Tang dynasty
The temple was first built by the then provincial governor of Chuzhou Li Youqing and monk Fachen between 766 and 770, during the reign of Dali period (766–779) in the Tang dynasty (618–907). After construction, Emperor Daizong (763–779) honored the name "Baoying Temple".

Five Dynasties and Ten Kingdoms
The temple was devastated by war between 954 and 960, during the Five Dynasties and Ten Kingdoms (907–960), but was soon rebuilt by the provincial governor Wang Zhu.

Song dynasty
In 978, in the 3rd year of Taiping Xingguo period (976–984) in the Song dynasty (960–1279), Emperor Taizong (976–997) inscribed and renamed it "Kaihua Chan Temple", more commonly known as "Langya Temple".

Yuan dynasty
Langya Temple was badly damaged by war between the Mongolian and the Red Turban Rebellion in the late Yuan dynasty (1291–1368).

Ming dynasty
After Zhu Yuanzhang (1368–1398) ascending the throne, the founder of the Ming dynasty (1368–1644), also adopted the policy to protect Buddhism. In 1373, monks Shaoning and Wuwei restored and refurbished the temple under the support of the government.

Qing dynasty
In the ruling of Jiaqing Emperor (1796–1820) in the Qing dynasty (1644–1911), master Haoqing renovated and redecorated the temple. The name was changed into "Kaihualü Temple".

Langya Temple became dilapidated during the war between the Taiping Rebellion and the Qing army under the rule of Xianfeng Emperor (1851–1861).

In 1904, in the reign of Guangxu Emperor (1862–1874), master Daxiu raised funds to rebuild the temple.

People's Republic of China
After the establishment of the Communist State in 1952, the Chuzhou Municipal Government has allocated moneys for the renovation project.

The temple was inscribed to the Provincial-level Cultural Heritage List of Anhui by the Anhui Provincial Government in 1956.

Langya Temple has been designated as a National Key Buddhist Temple in Han Chinese Area by the State Council of China in 1983.

Architecture
The existing main buildings include the Shanmen, Four Heavenly Kings Hall, Bell tower, Drum tower, Mahavira Hall and Buddhist Texts Library.

References

Buddhist temples in Chuzhou
Buildings and structures in Chuzhou
Tourist attractions in Chuzhou
1904 establishments in China
20th-century Buddhist temples
Religious buildings and structures completed in 1904